Westworth Village is a city in Tarrant County, Texas, United States. The population was 2,472 at the 2010 census.

History
The town's growth was helped in large part by the construction and development of Carswell Air Force Base. In 1941, the Fort Worth Chamber of Commerce deeded 1,400 acres to the federal government for the construction of the base, and the town was incorporated the same year.

Geography

Westworth Village is located at  (32.759412, –97.418519).

According to the United States Census Bureau, the city has a total area of 2.0 square miles (5.1 km2), all of it land.

Climate

The climate in this area is characterized by hot, humid summers and generally mild to cool winters.  According to the Köppen Climate Classification system, Westworth Village has a humid subtropical climate, abbreviated "Cfa" on climate maps.

Demographics

2020 census

As of the 2020 United States census, there were 2,585 people, 1,154 households, and 672 families residing in the city.

2000 census
As of the census of 2000, there were 2,124 people, 783 households, and 552 families residing in the city. The population density was 1,073.2 people per square mile (414.2/km2). There were 856 housing units at an average density of 432.5 per square mile (166.9/km2). The racial makeup of the city was 81.83% White, 4.24% African American, 1.27% Native American, 1.32% Asian, 0.28% Pacific Islander, 6.64% from other races, and 4.43% from two or more races. Hispanic or Latino of any race were 18.64% of the population.

There were 783 households, out of which 37.2% had children under the age of 18 living with them, 56.3% were married couples living together, 10.0% had a female householder with no husband present, and 29.5% were non-families. 23.9% of all households were made up of individuals, and 9.1% had someone living alone who was 65 years of age or older. The average household size was 2.71 and the average family size was 3.27.

In the city, the population was spread out, with 29.2% under the age of 18, 6.0% from 18 to 24, 34.2% from 25 to 44, 19.1% from 45 to 64, and 11.5% who were 65 years of age or older. The median age was 34 years. For every 100 females, there were 101.1 males. For every 100 females age 18 and over, there were 97.0 males.

The median income for a household in the city was $40,493, and the median income for a family was $47,212. Males had a median income of $30,965 versus $25,000 for females. The per capita income for the city was $19,495. About 6.2% of families and 9.1% of the population were below the poverty line, including 10.4% of those under age 18 and 2.4% of those age 65 or over.

Education
Westworth Village is served by the Fort Worth Independent School District.

Schools that serve Westworth Village include:
 Burton Hill Elementary School (Ft.Worth)
 Stripling Middle School (Fort Worth)
 Arlington Heights High School (Fort Worth)

Westworth Village Public Library serves the city.

Infrastructure

Police Department
The Westworth Village Police Department, based out of the Westworth Village Justice Center, serves the city.

Naval Air Station
The Naval Air Station Joint Reserve Base Fort Worth has some territory in Westworth Village.

References

External links
 City of Westworth Village official website
 Westworth Village Police Department
 Texas State Historical Association

Cities in Tarrant County, Texas
Cities in Texas
Dallas–Fort Worth metroplex
Westworth, Texas